Brent Weedman (born February 10, 1984) is a retired American mixed martial artist who has competed in Bellator's Welterweight division. He has competed in several Bellator Tournaments, including the: Bellator Season Four Welterweight Tournament, Bellator Season 5 Welterweight Tournament, and the Bellator Season 6 Lightweight Tournament. He is married to fellow Brazilian ju jitsu player, Emily Weedman.

Background
Weedman is from Louisville, Kentucky and began his formal training in the martial arts when he was four years old. Weedman's father, who was a police officer and a longtime martial artist himself, also ran a martial arts school. In addition to full-contact karate, Weedman began competitive judo when he was eight years old and also played football and soccer.

Mixed martial arts career

Early career
Weedman's professional career began in 2005. Making his debut in the HOOKnSHOOT promotion, Weedman finished his first fight with a draw after two rounds. Weedman later racked up two successive victories in the promotion before meeting future UFC veteran Gray Maynard. Weedman lost via unanimous decision, which gave Maynard his entry onto The Ultimate Fighter 5.

After a further win via TKO, Weedman was ranked as the number one 183 lb fighter in the Shooto rankings, despite him never competing in the Shooto organisation. Amongst his next fights were losses to Dan Hornbuckle via triangle choke and Anthony Lapsley via TKO due to a cut over his right eye.

In May 2008, with his record at 8–5–1, Weedman faced Douglas Lima for the AFL welterweight title. Weedman was reportedly brought in to the fight to showcase Lima's skills, as Weedman was expected to be an easy fight. Weedman threatened early on with a triangle choke which was unsuccessful. Late in the second round, Weedman again caught Lima in a triangle choke, but transitioned to an armbar, which forced Lima to submit, giving Weedman the title. He would go on to say "They brought me in because Douglas Lima would make a great champ for them. Now, it's my turn to step up. I feel good about the fact that I did a one-fight deal with them. We're going to talk a multi-fight contract now." Weedman was scheduled to defend the belt at AFL's first ever pay-per-view, though the bout failed to transpire and Weedman never fought for the promotion again.

Bellator Fighting Championships
Following five successive wins after his AFL title win, Weedman made his Bellator Fighting Championship debut at Bellator 16 against Rudy Bears. Weedman defeated Bears via KO at 4:19 of the opening round.

Weedman returned at Bellator 23, where he faced John Troyer. Weedman made quick work of Troyer, finishing him via armbar just before the end of the opening round.

At Bellator 30, Weedman faced Jacob McClintock, a former Bellator Welterweight Tournament competitor. The winner would reportedly receive a slot in Bellator's fourth season welterweight tournament. After just three minutes, Weedman was able to win the fight via TKO due to punches.

With the win, Weedman officially qualified for the Bellator Season Four Welterweight tournament, alongside the likes of Jim Wallhead, Rick Hawn and Dan Hornbuckle. Weedman fought Hornbuckle in the first round of the tournament, winning the fight by unanimous decision. However, due to the facial laceration he received during the fight, Weedman has been suspended 60 days, putting his position in the tournament in doubt. In his next fight Weedman fought Jay Hieron for a spot in the finals at Bellator 40 and lost a controversial unanimous decision (29-28, 29-28, 29-28).

Weedman entered into the Bellator Season 5 Welterweight Tournament. He fought Chris Lozano in the opening round held at Bellator 49 and lost the fight via unanimous decision.

After Weedman realized he was a very small Welterweight, he decided to drop to the lightweight division. He was granted instant entry to the Bellator Season 6 Lightweight Tournament. In the quarter-finals of the tournament, Weedman fought J.J. Ambrose at Bellator 62 on March 23, 2012. Weedman won the fight via submission (VonFflue choke) in the second round.

In the semi-final round Weedman fought Thiago Michel at Bellator 66. He won the fight via split decision. Weedman then faced Rick Hawn in the finals on May 25, 2012 at Bellator 70 in New Orleans, Louisiana. He lost the fight via unanimous decision.

In the opening round of Bellator Season 8 Welterweight Tournament Weedman faced off against Marius Zaromskis at Bellator 86. He won via unanimous decision. Weedman was supposed to face Douglas Lima in the semi-finals at Bellator 90. Weedman would be forced to withdraw from the fight due to injury. He was then replaced by Bryan Baker.

Weedman returned for the Season 9 Welterweight Tournament. He faced Justin Baesman in the quarterfinal opening round at Bellator 100 and won via first-round submission.

In the semifinals, he had a rematch with Rick Hawn and lost via unanimous decision.

Weedman has retired from MMA.

Skepticism

Weedman approached the James Randi Educational Foundation (JREF) expressing interest in representing the organization. In an interview with foundation president D.J. Grothe, Weedman discussed his interest in scientific skepticism. Weedman states, "The work that James Randi and the JREF do is very important, and I'm proud to be involved with you guys. I feel strongly about the cause." He cites James Randi, Carl Sagan, Neil DeGrasse Tyson, and Phil Plait as inspirations.

Weedman presented at The Amaz!ng Meeting 2013 where he discussed pseudoscience in the martial arts.

Championships and accomplishments

Mixed martial arts
Bellator Fighting Championships
Bellator Season 6 Lightweight Tournament Runner-Up

Mixed martial arts record

|-
|Loss
|align=center|22–9–1
|Rick Hawn
|Decision (unanimous)
|Bellator 104
|
|align=center|3
|align=center|5:00
|Cedar Rapids, Iowa, United States
|
|-
|Win
|align=center|22–8–1
|Justin Baesman
|Submission (armbar)
|Bellator 100
|
|align=center|1
|align=center|3:20
|Phoenix, Arizona, United States
|Bellator Season 9 Welterweight Tournament Quarterfinal
|-
|Win
|align=center|21–8–1
|Marius Zaromskis
|Decision (unanimous)
|Bellator 86
|
|align=center|3
|align=center|5:00
|Thackerville, Oklahoma, United States
|Bellator Season 8 Welterweight Tournament Quarterfinal
|-
|Loss
|align=center|20–8–1
|Rick Hawn
|Decision (unanimous)
|Bellator 70
|
|align=center|3
|align=center|5:00
|New Orleans, Louisiana, United States
|Bellator Season 6 Lightweight Tournament Final
|-
|Win
|align=center|20–7–1
|Thiago Michel
|Decision (split)
|Bellator 66
|
|align=center|3
|align=center|5:00
|Cleveland, Ohio, United States
|Bellator Season 6 Lightweight Tournament Semifinal
|-
|Win
|align=center|19–7–1
|J.J. Ambrose
|Submission (Von Flue choke)
|Bellator 62
|
|align=center|2
|align=center|3:26
|Laredo, Texas, United States
|Bellator Season 6 Lightweight Tournament Quarterfinal
|-
| Loss
|align=center|18–7–1
|Chris Lozano
|Decision (unanimous)
|Bellator 49
|
|align=center|3
|align=center|5:00
|Atlantic City, New Jersey, United States
|Bellator Season 5 Welterweight Tournament Quarterfinal
|-
|Loss
|align=center|18–6–1
|Jay Hieron
|Decision (unanimous)
|Bellator 40
|
|align=center|3
|align=center|5:00
|Newkirk, Oklahoma, United States
|Welterweight Tournament Semifinal
|-
|Win
|align=center|18–5–1
|Dan Hornbuckle
|Decision (unanimous)
|Bellator 35
|
|align=center|3
|align=center|5:00
|Lemoore, California, United States
|Welterweight Tournament Quarterfinal
|-
|Win
|align=center|17–5–1
|Jacob McClintock
|TKO (knee to the body & punches)
|Bellator 30
|
|align=center|1
|align=center|3:05
|Louisville, Kentucky, United States
|<small>Qualified for the Bellator Season Four tournament
|-
|Win
|align=center|16–5–1
|John Troyer
|Submission (armbar)
|Bellator 23
|
|align=center|1
|align=center|4:55
|Louisville, Kentucky, United States
|
|-
|Win
|align=center|15–5–1
|Rudy Bears
|KO (punches)
|Bellator 16
|
|align=center|1
|align=center|4:19
|Kansas City, Missouri, United States
|
|-
|Win
|align=center|14–5–1
|Akbarh Arreola
|TKO (punches)
|MMA Xtreme 23
|
|align=center|2
|align=center|0:42
|Cancun, Mexico
|
|-
|Win
|align=center|13–5–1
|Robert Thompson
|Submission (rear-naked choke)
|EFA: Rebels Without a Cause
|
|align=center|1
|align=center|2:34
|Monroe, Louisiana, United States
|
|-
|Win
|align=center|12–5–1
|John Mckean
|TKO (punches)
|EFA: Rebels Without a Cause 
|
|align=center|1
|align=center|2:48
|Monroe, Louisiana, United States
|
|-
|Win
|align=center|11–5–1
|Tim Stout
|TKO (punches)
|Bullet Fight Gear: Last Man Standing
|
|align=center|1
|align=center|4:03
|Kennesaw, Georgia, United States
|
|-
|Win
|align=center|10–5–1
|David Gaston
|Submission (rear-naked choke)
|UFL: Fight Night at The Murat 
|
|align=center|2
|align=center|2:49
|Indianapolis, Indiana, United States
|
|-
|Win
|align=center|9–5–1
|Douglas Lima
|Submission (armbar)
|AFL: Bulletproof
|
|align=center|2
|align=center|4:39
|Atlanta, Georgia, United States
|Won the AFL Welterweight Championship
|-
|Loss
|align=center|8–5–1
|Rhomez Brower
|Decision (split)
|Bullet Fight Gear: Showdown
|
|align=center|3
|align=center|5:00
|Kennesaw, Georgia, United States
|
|-
|Win
|align=center|8–4–1
|Matt Shaw
|Submission (punches)
|Wild Bill's: Fight Night 12
|
|align=center|1
|align=center|0:39
|Atlanta, Georgia, United States
|
|-
|Loss
|align=center|7–4–1
|Anthony Lapsley
|TKO (cut)
|UFL: Fight Night at Conseco Fieldhouse
|
|align=center|1
|align=center|3:24
|Indianapolis, Indiana, United States
|
|-
|Win
|align=center|7–3–1
|Jake Short
|TKO (corner stoppage)
|Wild Bill's: Fight Night 9
|
|align=center|1
|align=center|4:28
|Atlanta, Georgia, United States
|
|-
|Win
|align=center|6–3–1
|David Hulett
|Submission
|Wild Bill's: Fight Night 8
|
|align=center|1
|align=center|2:41
|Atlanta, Georgia, United States
|
|-
|Win
|align=center|5–3–1
|Chris Connelly
|TKO (punches)
|Wild Bill's: Fight Night 8
|
|align=center|1
|align=center|0:52
|Atlanta, Georgia, United States
|
|-
|Loss
|align=center|4–3–1
|Jake Short
|Decision (majority)
|Wild Bill's: Fight Night 7
|
|align=center|3
|align=center|5:00
|Atlanta, Georgia, United States
|
|-
|Win
|align=center|4–2–1
|Hans Marrero
|TKO (punches)
|Wild Bill's: Fight Night 7
|
|align=center|1
|align=center|1:29
|Atlanta, Georgia, United States
|
|-
|Loss
|align=center|3–2–1
|Dan Hornbuckle
|Submission (triangle choke)
|LOF 12: Black Tie Battles
|
|align=center|2
|align=center|3:31
|Indianapolis, Indiana, United States
|
|-
|Win
|align=center|3–1–1
|Lucas Gwaltney
|TKO (corner stoppage)
|Legends of Fighting 8
|
|align=center|3
|align=center|1:45
|Indianapolis, Indiana, United States
|
|-
|Loss
|align=center|2–1–1
|Gray Maynard
|Decision (unanimous)
|WEF: Orleans Arena
|
|align=center|3
|align=center|5:00
|Paradise, Nevada, United States
|
|-
|Win
|align=center|2–0–1
|Josh Cate
|KO (punch)
|HOOKnSHOOT: Live
|
|align=center|1
|align=center|N/A
|Evansville, Indiana, United States
|
|-
|Win
|align=center|1–0–1
|Anthony Stevens
|Submission
|HOOKnSHOOT: Grand Prix
|
|align=center|N/A
|align=center|N/A
|Evansville, Indiana, United States
|
|-
| Draw
|align=center|0–0–1
|Scott Henze
|Draw
|HOOKnSHOOT: The Final Showdown
|
|align=center|2
|align=center|5:00
|Evansville, Indiana, United States
|

References

External links

American male mixed martial artists
Welterweight mixed martial artists
Mixed martial artists utilizing judo
Mixed martial artists utilizing karate
Mixed martial artists utilizing Brazilian jiu-jitsu
American practitioners of Brazilian jiu-jitsu
People awarded a black belt in Brazilian jiu-jitsu
American male judoka
American male karateka
Sportspeople from Louisville, Kentucky
Living people
1984 births